is a city located in Ibaraki Prefecture, Japan. , the city had an estimated population of 27,522 in 11,651 households and a population density of 140 persons per km². The percentage of the population aged over 65 was 36.2%.

Geography
Located in northern Ibaraki Prefecture, Takahagi is bordered by the Pacific Ocean to the east, and by Fukushima Prefecture to the northwest.

Surrounding municipalities
Ibaraki Prefecture
 Kitaibaraki
 Hitachi
 Hitachiōta
Fukushima Prefecture
Hanawa

Climate
Takahagi has a Humid continental climate (Köppen Cfa) characterized by warm summers and cold winters with heavy snowfall.  The average annual temperature in Takahagi is 13.9 °C. The average annual rainfall is 1429 mm with September as the wettest month. The temperatures are highest on average in August, at around 24.9 °C, and lowest in January, at around 3.8 °C.

Demographics
Per Japanese census data, the population of Takahagi has declined in recent decades.

History
During the Edo period, Takahagi was the jōkamachi of Matsuoka Domain, one of the feudal domains of the Tokugawa shogunate in Hitachi Province, ruled b the Nakamura clan, the hereditary karō of Mito Domain. With the creation of the modern municipalities system after the Meiji Restoration on April 1, 1889, the town of Matsubara, and the villages of Matsuoka, Takaoka, Kurosaki and Kushigata was established within Taga District, Ibaraki). Matsuoka was raised to town status on April 17, 1928. Matsubara was renamed Takahagi on October 1, 1937.

Takahagi merged with Matsubara, Takaoka and Kurosaki on November 23, 1954 and was raised to city status. The city suffered considerable damage in the 2011 Tōhoku earthquake and tsunami.

Government
Takahagi has a mayor-council form of government with a directly elected mayor and a unicameral city council of 14 members. Takahagi, together with neighboring Kitaibaraki, contributes two members to the Ibaraki Prefectural Assembly. In terms of national politics, the city is part of Ibaraki 5th district of the lower house of the Diet of Japan.

Economy
Takahagi was once part of the Jōban coal fields, but the mines were exhausted by the 1960s. Since that time, the economy had been oriented towards light manufacturing and food processing. Agriculture and commercial fishing also play subordinate roles.

Education
Takahagi has four public elementary schools and three public middle schools operated by the city government, and two public high schools operated by the Ibaraki Prefectural Board of Education. There is also one private high school

Transportation

Railway
 JR East – Jōban Line

Highway
  – Takahagi Interchange

Local attractions
Matsuoka Castle ruins
Hanazono-Hananuki Prefectural Nature Park
Hananuki Dam
Takado Beach

Noted people from Takahagi
Jinzō Matsumura, botanist

References

External links

Official Website 

Cities in Ibaraki Prefecture
Populated coastal places in Japan
Takahagi, Ibaraki